The German Phono Museum is a museum in Baden-Württemberg in the town of Sankt Georgen im Schwarzwald.

The museum portrays the history of the music industry, beginning with phonographs and continuing right up to the modern CD. In the museum, in addition to old record players that were produced by local firms, Dual and Perpetuum-Ebner (PE), there are gramophones, which were the predecessors of the record player. Television sets from the 1930s to the 1960s, and more recent devices such as portable cassette players and the Walkman, and video recording equipment such as VHS and Betamax recorders, as well as professional radio and television equipment are also exhibited.

The museum was opened for the first time on 15 July 2011, and in 2015, there were about 5000 visitors.  The museum is located in the former department store, Brigau. It is open from Tuesday to Sunday. Group guided tours may be booked in advance.

See also 
 List of museums in Germany
 List of music museums

References

Further reading 
 Deutsches Phono-Museum. Stadt  St. Georgen, St. Georgen 1996, (Kunst & Kultur in St. Georgen), (Schriftenreihe St. Georgener Museen Broschüre 2).

External links 
 Museum homepage

Buildings and structures in Schwarzwald-Baar-Kreis
Museums in Baden-Württemberg
Media museums in Germany
Music museums in Germany
St. George's Abbey in the Black Forest
Black Forest